Sleeping Dogs is a 1977 New Zealand action thriller film directed by Roger Donaldson, who also produced with Larry Parr. The film is based on the book Smith's Dream by C.K. Stead. The film stars Sam Neill, Clyde Scott, and Warren Oates, it is notable for being the first feature-length 35 mm film produced entirely in New Zealand. The film was a major success critically and commercially, and launched the career of Sam Neill.

A political thriller with action film elements, it follows the lead character "Smith" (Neill) as New Zealand plunges into a police state as a fascist government institutes martial law after industrial disputes flare into violence.  Smith gets caught between the special police and a growing resistance movement, and reluctantly becomes involved. Often named one of the best New Zealand films of all time, it is considered a classic and a landmark in the new wave of New Zealand cinema that has flourished from the 1970s onward.

Plot
Following the break-up of his marriage caused by his wife's affair with another man named Bullen, Smith arranges to live on the Coromandel Peninsula on an island owned by a Maori tribe.  Meanwhile, political tension escalates as an oil embargo leaves the country in an energy crisis.  Tension boils over into a civil war and guerrilla activity.  However, Smith and his dog enjoy peaceful island life, having little interaction with the rest of society.

Smith's idyllic life is shattered when a bomb is exploded in a nearby town, and police arrive on his island to arrest him and search for illegal weapons. After they find a cache of explosives that Smith had been unaware of, he is taken to a police station, where he is imprisoned, interrogated, and tortured. The dog is last seen swimming after the boat in which Smith is being taken away.  Smith recognizes one policeman as a former schoolmate, Jesperson, who then takes over the interrogation.  Jesperson reveals that the government regard Smith as a key leader of the guerillas and offers expulsion from New Zealand in return for a confession, or alternatively trial by a military tribunal with a likely death sentence.

During a prison transfer, Smith deliberately forces himself to vomit to confuse his captors, and escapes.  He then flees the city, finding work at a small campground.  Happy to be outside the civil war again, Smith blends in until a US Army unit arrives and takes over the campground.  Smith clashes with Willoughby, the commander of the US forces, who suspects Smith of being a rebel sympathiser. The arrival of Bullen, who is now a senior leader of the underground guerrilla movement, complicates matters further. As the US forces capture and kill more rebels, Smith is unwillingly drawn into participating in an attack on the military unit by Bullen.

Fleeing the scene of the successful attack, Smith and Bullen are pursued by government forces and cornered in a nearby forest.  After government forces surround the guerrillas and bomb their encampment, Smith and Bullen escape, only to be cornered by Jesperson and his elite squad.  After Bullen is fatally wounded, Smithwishing an end to what is happeningdeliberately provokes Jesperson into shooting him.

Cast
 Sam Neill as Smith
 Nevan Rowe as Gloria
 Ian Mune as Bullen 
 Ian Watkin as Dudley 
 Warren Oates as Colonel Willoughby
 Clyde Scott as Jesperson
 Bill Johnson as Cousins
 Don Selwyn as Taupiri
 Donna Akersten as Mary
 Davina Whitehouse as Elsie
 Tony Martin as Intrigued School Child
 Roger Oakley as Assassin Leader
 Snuffles (dog)

Production
The scene in which Sam Neill ("Smith") escapes the police van and runs off into the crowded street was filmed without formal permission from the police. When Neill's stunt double ran from the van, an off-duty police officer tackled him, mistaking the stuntman for a real criminal attempting to escape custody. The stuntman had to point out the camera crew to get the officer to release him.

In the scene where Warren Oates steps out of his jeep and meets "Smith", he is actually holding a page of the script, fearing that he would forget the lines. Oates acted as if the paper were  a list of directions to the motel.

The riot scenes in which police with batons and shields beat back protestors closely mirrored actions of police and protestors four years later during the 1981 South African national rugby team's – the Springboks' – tour in New Zealand,  which sparked anti-apartheid protests.

RNZAF A-4 Skyhawks also featured in the film courtesy of the permission obtained through AVM Siegert.

Reception
The film was the highest-grossing New Zealand film in New Zealand at the time with a gross of $450,000.

References
 
New Zealand Film 1912–1996 by Helen Martin & Sam Edwards p64 (1997, Oxford University Press, Auckland)

External links

Sleeping Dogs (1977) at New Zealand Feature Film Database

1977 films
1977 directorial debut films
1970s action thriller films
1970s English-language films
1970s New Zealand films
1970s vigilante films
Coromandel Peninsula
Dystopian films
Films based on New Zealand novels
Films directed by Roger Donaldson
Films set in Auckland
Films shot in New Zealand
New Zealand films about revenge
New Zealand action thriller films
New Zealand vigilante films
Political thriller films